Isaac served as Greek Patriarch of Alexandria between 941 and 954.

References
 

10th-century Patriarchs of Alexandria
Melkites in the Abbasid Caliphate